Isabella Tena Nava (born January 25, 2007, in Mexico City, Mexico) is a Mexican child actress.

Tena has participated in a series of telenovelas and theater plays, among them Mi corazon es tuyo alongside Jorge Salinas, Sueño de amor (where she acted alongside Julian Gil and in which her birthday was celebrated during an early recording of the show) and Mi marido tiene familia, alongside actress Silvia Pinal. She also acted in one episode of Como dice el dicho, a Mexican drama series.

Filmography

Telenovelas 
 El amor invencible (2023) - Ana Julia Peralta Torrenegro
 Mi marido tiene más familia (2018–2019) – Frida Córcega
 Mi marido tiene familia (2017) – Frida Córcega
 Sueño de amor (2016) – Selena Alegria
 Mi corazón es tuyo (2014) – Luz "Luzecita" Lascurain Diez

Television series 
 Como dice el dicho 
 Chapter: En casa de herrero, cuchillo de palo (2017) – Nayeli
 La rosa de Guadalupe
 Chapter: Tres destinos (2016) – Consuelo
 Chapter: La primera puerta (2016) – Doris

Internet shows 
 Show de Polly (2020) – Guest
 Que mosca te picó (2018) – Interviewed

Television shows 
 Kids Choice Awards México (2015) – Galardonada
 En Familia Con Chabelo (2015) – Invitada
 Hoy (2015 y 2020) – Invitada

Commercials 
 Puedes estar lejos pero cerca "Televisa campaign" (2020) – herself
 La vida es mejor "Televisa commercial (2014) – herself

Theater 
 Tu no existes (2016) – Ana
 Mi corazón es tuyo (2015) – Luz "Luzecita" Lascurain Diez

Songs 
 Canciones con el elenco de Mi corazón es tuyo
 «Volveremos a ser» Invitada (2015)
 «Eres» (2015) 
 «El amor triunfó»  (2015)
 «Todos en la cocina» (2015)
 «El rap de la bruja»  (2015)
 «El rap del tío y el abuelo»  (2015) 
 «El niño del tambor»  (2015)
 «Los peces en el río»  (2015)

Awards and nominations

Kids Choice Awards México

References

2007 births
Living people
Mexican child actresses
Mexican actresses
People from Mexico City